Couch-Artrip House, also known as "Longmeadow" and "The Holmwood," is a historic home located near Southside, Mason County, West Virginia.  It was built about 1830, and is a two-story brick residence in a vernacular Greek Revival-style.  It features an Italianate style front porch and one-story addition, added about 1875.  It also has a corbeled cornice composed of four brick courses.  Also on the property are a two-room, one-story Greek Revival office / school room and a log building.

It was listed on the National Register of Historic Places in 1984.

References

Houses on the National Register of Historic Places in West Virginia
Greek Revival houses in West Virginia
Houses completed in 1830
Houses in Mason County, West Virginia
Italianate architecture in West Virginia
National Register of Historic Places in Mason County, West Virginia
1830 establishments in Virginia